The Bayer designation A Tauri (A Tau) is shared by two stars in the constellation Taurus:

 A1 Tauri (37 Tauri)
 A2 Tauri (39 Tauri)

See also
 Alpha Tauri (α Tauri, 87 Tauri), the star Aldebaran; sometimes mistakenly rendered as "Α Tauri" (Greek uppercase alpha) or "A Tauri" (Latin letter "A")
 AlphaTauri (disambiguation)

Tauri, A
Taurus (constellation)